Mountain west may refer to:

 Mountain States region of the U.S.A.
 Mountain West Hockey League, of the Western U.S.A.
 Mountain West Athletic Conference, former U.S. women's collegiate athletics conference
 Mountain West Conference, NCAA Division I American college football subdivision
 Mountain West Conference Tournament (disambiguation)

See also
 Mount West, Antarctica
 West Mountain (disambiguation)
 Westmont (disambiguation)
 Westmount (disambiguation)
 Mountain (disambiguation)
 West (disambiguation)